Rye is a Statutory Town in Pueblo County, Colorado, United States.  It is part of the Pueblo, Colorado Metropolitan Statistical Area.  The population was 153 at the 2010 census.

A post office called Rye has been in operation since 1881. Some say the community was named for the wild rye native to the area, while others believe the place is named for rye whiskey.

Geography
Rye is located in the Greenhorn Valley at  (37.921876, −104.929999).

Climate

Rye has a (Köppen Cfb), a climate type usually associated with maritime regions, but that is also found in high elevation areas in which summer temperatures are moderated by altitude. Precipitation exceeds that of semi-arid places, and average winter temperatures exceed freezing (O°C, 32°F). This isolated pocket of climate exists due to the orographic enhancement of precipitation levels and summers moderated by altitude. Despite its exceptional classification, Rye has much in common with other locations in its part of Colorado. Although conditions are not wet at any time of year, there is increased precipitation in March and April, as well as a snowfall maximum in March, with the snowiest periods being November and January through April. The North American Monsoon creates a second wet period in June and July. This climate features summers with warm daytime temperatures and mild to cool nights, along with chilly and snowy winters.

Demographics

As of the census of 2000, there were 202 people, 87 households, and 52 families residing in the town. The racial makeup of the town was 91.09% White, 0.50% African American, 0.50% Native American, 1.49% from other races, and 6.44% from two or more races. Hispanic or Latino of any race were 3.47% of the population.

There were 87 households, out of which 27.6% had children under the age of 18 living with them, 43.7% were married couples living together, 5.7% had a female householder with no husband present, and 39.1% were non-families. 34.5% of all households were made up of individuals, and 14.9% had someone living alone who was 65 years of age or older.  The average household size was 2.32 and the average family size was 3.02.

In the town, the population was spread out, with 23.8% under the age of 18, 8.9% from 18 to 24, 23.8% from 25 to 44, 24.3% from 45 to 64, and 19.3% who were 65 years of age or older.  The median age was 42 years. For every 100 females, there were 110.4 males.  For every 100 females age 18 and over, there were 102.6 males.

The median income for a household in the town was $33,750, and the median income for a family was $43,750. Males had a median income of $21,250 versus $20,625 for females. The per capita income for the town was $15,681.  About 7.1% of families and 11.8% of the population were below the poverty line, including 13.3% of those under the age of eighteen and 11.8% of those 65 or over.

Education

Pueblo County School District 70 operates public schools, including Rye Elementary School and Rye High School, both near the town limits.

See also

Outline of Colorado
Index of Colorado-related articles
State of Colorado
Colorado cities and towns
Colorado municipalities
Colorado counties
Pueblo County, Colorado
Colorado metropolitan areas
Front Range Urban Corridor
South Central Colorado Urban Area
Pueblo, CO Metropolitan Statistical Area

References

External links
CDOT map of the Town of Rye

Towns in Pueblo County, Colorado
Towns in Colorado